The Lorain West Breakwater Light, also called the Lorain Harbor Light, is a lighthouse in Lorain, Ohio, United States. The light was built in 1917 on Lake Erie by the United States Army Corps of Engineers. It was taken out of service in 1965 when it was replaced by an automated lighttower on a nearby breakwater. The light was added to the National Register of Historic Places in 1978.

References

Further reading
 Oleszewski, Wes. Great Lakes Lighthouses, American and Canadian: A Comprehensive Directory/Guide to Great Lakes Lighthouses, (Gwinn, Michigan: Avery Color Studios, Inc., 1998) .
 U.S. Coast Guard. Historically Famous Lighthouses (Washington, D.C.: Government Printing Office, 1957).
 Wright, Larry and Wright, Patricia. Great Lakes Lighthouses Encyclopedia Hardback (Erin: Boston Mills Press, 2006)

External links

Buildings and structures in Lorain, Ohio
National Register of Historic Places in Lorain County, Ohio
Lighthouses on the National Register of Historic Places in Ohio
Lighthouses completed in 1917
Transportation in Lorain County, Ohio